"Blind Date" is episode 21 of season 1 in the television show Angel. Written by Jeannine Renshaw and directed by Thomas J. Wright, it was originally broadcast on May 16, 2000, on the WB network. In Blind Date, Angel reluctantly agrees to help lawyer Lindsey McDonald save a group of three blind children from a blind woman assassin hired by the Senior Partners of Wolfram & Hart.  However, Lindsey struggles with his decision to save the children and betray the firm when Holland Manners, Lindsey's supervisor, offers him the promotion of a lifetime.

Summary
Angel reluctantly agrees to help Lindsey McDonald crack the secret files of Wolfram & Hart to save a group of three blind children from a blind woman assassin hired by the unseen Senior Partners of the firm to kill the children. With a little help from Lindsey and Gunn who cause a diversion, Angel sneaks into the ultra-high-tech security firm to steal the firm’s computer files and also takes an ancient scroll he finds in the building safe. But Lindsey isn’t sure if he can stick by his decision to help Angel and betray the firm by sabotaging the deadly mission when Holland Manners, Lindsey‘s supervisor, offers him the promotion of a lifetime.

Acting
Jennifer Badger, who guest stars as Vanessa, has previously been Charisma Carpenter and Eliza Dushku's stunt double in both Buffy and Angel. She was also one of the victims in Somnambulist, the eleventh episode of Angel season 1.

Production details
Special effects Supervisor Loni Peristere says they couldn't afford to shoot Vanessa's perspective using greenscreen, so instead they came up with the "crazy idea" of painting the actors with glow-in-the-dark paint and shooting the scenes in the dark.  The effect was intensified by offsetting the footage to create tracers, and then reversing the image - "it was supposed to tell the story that she sees the action before it actually happens," explains Peristere. "It was such a wacky idea and it really worked out well."

Writing
Producer Tim Minear explains that this episode provides a "detailed exploration of Wolfram & Hart, establishing the power base there and laying the groundwork for Season Two." It also provides backstory for the character of Lindsey, including his motivations for working at Wolfram & Hart.

Reception
In an essay entitled "Why We Love Lindsey", M.S. West says the scene at the end of the episode "fulfills Joss Whedon's earlier promise of a more adult show with less clear fault-lines of right and wrong." Lindsey makes a difficult choice between redemption and power, ultimately choosing to accept the promotion. "In that moment," West writes, "Lindsey is what Angel the show struggled through its first season to be."

References

External links

 

Angel (season 1) episodes
2000 American television episodes